The , officially the , is a funicular railway in the town of Hakone, Kanagawa Prefecture, Japan. The company belongs to the Odakyū Group.

At Sōunzan, connection is made with the Hakone Ropeway, which runs to Tōgendai on Lake Ashi. 

Opened in 1922, the line was rebuilt in 1995, when new cars replaced the old. In March 2020, the cars were replaced again with two new two-car red and blue trainsets supplied by Keio Juuki Seibi Co. Each trainset is able to accommodate up to 250 passengers.

Statistics 
The line has the following technical parameters:

Length: 
Height: 
Maximum Steepness: 20%
Gauge 983mm
Cars: 2
Capacity: 250 passengers per car
Configuration: Single track with passing loop
Journey time: 9 minutes
Traction: Electricity

Stations

See also 
 List of funicular railways

References

External links 
 Official website by Hakone Tozan Railway
  Official website by Odakyū

Funicular railways in Japan
Lines of Hakone Tozan Railway
Tourist attractions in Kanagawa Prefecture

Transport in Kanagawa Prefecture
Hakone, Kanagawa
1922 establishments in Japan